This is a list of Danish television related events from 2004.

Events
7 February - Tomas Thordarson is selected to represent Denmark at the 2004 Eurovision Song Contest with his song "Sig det' løgn". He is selected to be the thirty-second Danish Eurovision entry during Dansk Melodi Grand Prix held at the Atletion in Aarhus.
16 November - Rikke Emma Niebuhr wins the second season of Idols.
27 November - Johnni Johansen wins season 3 of Big Brother.

Debuts

Domestic
10 October - The Eagle (DR) (2004-2006)

International
January -  Tractor Tom (TV2)

Television shows

1990s
Hvem vil være millionær? (1999–present)

2000s
Big Brother (2001-2005, 2012-2014)

Ending this year

Idols (2003-2004)

Births

Deaths

See also
 2004 in Denmark